Yajuvendra Krishanatry (born 14 December 1983) also known as Yaju Krishanatry is an Indian cricketer born in Meerut, Uttar Pradesh. He is a right-handed batsman and medium-pace bowler. He plays for Jharkhand.

References

1983 births
Living people
Indian cricketers
Jharkhand cricketers
East Zone cricketers
India Blue cricketers